The Commissioner of Public Markets, Weights, and Measures of the City of New York was a cabinet-level post appointed by the mayor of New York City during World War I, when foodstuffs were in short supply and people began hoarding. The goal was to "set fair prices for meat and fish." The commissioner had jurisdiction over all public markets, market places, and all auctioneers. The office started after World War I and in 1968, the Department of Markets (as it was by then known) was merged with the Department of Licenses by (Markets) Commissioner Gerard M. Weisberg to become the Department of Consumer Affairs.

Commissioners
Henry Moskowitz, c. 1917.
Jonathan C. Day, c. 1918. fired by mayor John F. Hylan
William P. Mulry, 1919 as Acting Commissioner under mayor John F. Hylan.
Edwin Joseph O'Malley, c. 1919-1927 for 7 years under mayor John F. Hylan and survived a graft investigation.
Thomas F. Dwyer, c. 1930 to 1932. He concluded that direct rail delivery of food to the Bronx Terminal Market could have saved consumers millions of dollars
Jere F. Ryan, 1932 to 1933
J. Bonynge, c. 1934 
William Fellowes Morgan, Jr., c. 1935 to 1939  
Daniel P. Wooley, c. 1943-1944.
Eugene G. Schulz, c. 1949.
Albert S. Pacetta, c. 1965.
Samuel J. Kearing, Jr., 1966.
Gerard Maxwell Weisberg, 1966 to 1968.

Deputy commissioners
William P. Mulry, 1919
Edwin Joseph O'Malley, 1919
Samuel Buchler, November 1919 
Mrs. John Marshall Gallagher, c. 1922
Mrs. Louis R. Welzmiller, c. 1922 
John Joseph Delaney, 1924 through 1931 
Alex Pisciotta, 1937

References

Further reading
Columbia Law Review, volume 34, number 7; November 1934, pp. 1369–1370. "The Commissioner of Public Markets, Weights, and Measures of the City of New York refused to issue a license to the petitioner to vend ice on the ground ..."

Government of New York City